Erika Hoffman is an English actress known for portraying Lesley Bainbridge in the BBC comedy Brush Strokes from series two onwards. When the Brush Strokes series ended, she joined fellow cast member Howard Lew Lewis in the Channel 4 comedy series Chelmsford 123, where she played Gargamadua.

Career 
In 1986, she played Anna, a 19-year-old pregnant German girl, in the Only Fools and Horses episode "From Prussia with Love". In the ITV comedy Room at the Bottom, she played secretary Nancy, alongside James Bolam and Richard Wilson.

In the Yorkshire Television 1986 comedy Home To Roost, she played April, a charity worker, alongside John Thaw and Reece Dinsdale. She also appeared in a minor role in Just Good Friends. She appeared in the 1990s soap opera Machair, playing Charlotte Van Agten. Hoffman appeared on stage and in television films such as Last Days of Patton and as "The Lady" in To Play the King.

Filmography

Television

References

1960s births
Living people
British film actresses
British stage actresses
British television actresses
Date of birth missing (living people)
Place of birth missing (living people)